Wei Dongyi (born 1991) is a Chinese mathematician, born in Jinan, Shandong province. Currently, he is an assistant professor and assistant researcher at School of Mathematical Science, Peking University. Wei Dongyi graduated from Attached Senior School of Shandong Normal University, studied at Peking University since 2010, earned his bachelor's degree in 2014 and Phd in 2018 under Tian Gang as his doctoral advisor. His research field includes partial differential equations and differential geometry. In December 2019, he became assistant professor. His simple living style attracted huge attention from Chinese internet. In 2021, he was called Peking University's ugliest teacher due to his unkempt appearance.

Education 
Wei earned his bachelor's degree from Peking University in 2014.

In 2019, Wei completed his post-doctoral work and became an assistant professor in the Mathematics Department of Peking University.

Internet fame 
Wei Dongyi became viral on the internet from a street interview in May 2021 when he was seen dressed in an unassuming manner, holding a large bottle of drinking water and a bag of mantou (steamed bun), while answering the street interviewer. His appearance has led to netizens dubbing him the "sweeping monk" of Peking University.

A group of doctorate mathematicians had been struggling to build a mathematical model for months and called Wei Dongyi for help. Wei Dongyi provided equations to alter their experiment which resulted in the mathematical model obtaining a 96% passing rate. The mathematicians wanted to pay the professor to show their gratitude, but he declined. "It’s unnecessary to pay me for such an easy problem," he said. Wei eventually asked for a recharge of his transport card as a form of compensation. 

It was reported that Wei got an appealing offer from Harvard University promising to exempt him from English language tests and to provide an interpreter. Wei, however, chose to stay at Peking University for his master's degree, after which he got his PhD in only three and a half years.

Wei Dongyi is nicknamed “God Wei” by Chinese netizens.

Academic works
 Wei Dongyi. "Regularity criterion to the axially symmetric Navier-Stokes equations". Journal of Mathematical Analysis and Applications. 435 (2016), no. 1, 402-413.
 Wendong Wang, Dongyi Wei, Zhifei Zhang. "Energy identity for approximate harmonic maps from surfaces to general targets", Journal of Functional Analysis. 272 (2017), 776-803.
 Wei Dongyi, Zhang Zhifei. "Global well-posedness of the MHD equations in a homogeneous magnetic field". Analysis & PDE . 10 (2017), no. 6, 1361-1406.
 Wei Dongyi, Zhang Zhifei, Zhao Weiren. "Linear inviscid damping for a class of monotone shear flow in Sobolev spaces". Communications on Pure and Applied Mathematics. 71 (2018), no. 4, 617-687.
 Wei Dongyi, Zhang Zhifei, Zhao Weiren. "Linear inviscid damping and vorticity depletion for shear flows". Annals of PDE. 5 (2019), no. 1, Art. 3, 101 pp.

References

People from Jinan
Academic staff of Peking University
21st-century Chinese mathematicians
Peking University alumni
International Mathematical Olympiad participants
1991 births
Living people